Westley David Allen (born September 17, 1986 in Austin, Texas) is an American soccer player.

Career

Youth and Amateur
Allen grew up in Austin, Texas, attended L. C. Anderson High School, and played college soccer at Oakland University, where he earned Third Team All-American Honors as a freshman.

Undrafted out of college, Allen played for the University of Texas club team, and played for Austin Aztex U23 in the USL Premier Development League in 2008.

Professional
Allen signed with Austin Aztex of the USL First Division for the 2009 season, and made his debut for the team on May 29, 2009, in a game against Puerto Rico Islanders. He was released by the Aztex at the end of the 2009 season, but re-signed prior to the 2010 season.

On March 11, 2011, Allen re-signed with the club, which had moved to Orlando, Florida after the 2010 season, renamed itself Orlando City, and aligned itself with the USL Pro league. The club signed Allen to a multi-year contract on September 1, 2011.

Honours

Orlando City
USL Pro (1): 2011

References

External links
 Austin Aztex bio

1986 births
Living people
Soccer players from Austin, Texas
Oakland Golden Grizzlies men's soccer players
Austin Aztex U23 players
Austin Aztex FC players
Orlando City SC (2010–2014) players
USL League Two players
USSF Division 2 Professional League players
USL Championship players
Association football defenders
American soccer players